Brignoliella ratnapura is a species of spider of the genus Brignoliella. It is endemic to Sri Lanka. B. ratnapura was first described from specimens recovered in the Ratnapura region, hence the spider's specific name.

See also
 List of Tetrablemmidae species

References

Tetrablemmidae
Endemic fauna of Sri Lanka
Spiders of Asia
Spiders described in 1988